Keiko Taguchi (born 26 February 1979) is a Japanese former professional tennis player.

Taguchi, who won 12 ITF doubles titles, made her only WTA Tour main draw appearance at the 2006 Japan Open, where she partnered with Ayami Takase in the doubles.

ITF finals

Singles: 1 (0–1)

Doubles: 19 (12–7)

References

External links
 
 

1979 births
Living people
Japanese female tennis players
20th-century Japanese women
21st-century Japanese women